Arlington is a neighborhood in Kearny in the western part of Hudson County, New Jersey, United States. Kearny Riverbank Park runs along the neighborhood's Passaic River shore. Arlington Memorial Park cemetery is located on Schuyler Avenue.

The community was the location of a railroad station on New Jersey Transit, just east of the WR Draw over the river, which was discontinued with the opening of the Montclair Connection and Secaucus Junction. The Bergen County town of North Arlington takes its name in relation to this community, which it borders.

Notable person
Leo Kiely, professional baseball player who lived in Arlington after his playing career was over.

References

Kearny, New Jersey
Neighborhoods in Hudson County, New Jersey